Shoaib Khan (born 1985) is a cricket player.

Shoaib Khan may also refer to:
Shoaib Khan (cricketer, born 1978), Pakistani cricketer
Shoaib Khan (Omani cricketer), Omani cricketer
Shoaib Md Khan (born 1991), Indian cricketer
Shoaib Sultan Khan, one of the pioneers of rural development programmes in Pakistan